Ishvari Singh (1721 – 12 December 1750) was the Raja of Amber Kingdom (1743 – 1750). He was a son of Jai Singh II, Raja of Jaipur.

Biography

After the death of Jai Singh, his 25-year-old son Ishwari Singh ascended the throne.  Madho Singh, half brother of Ishwari Singh laid siege around Jaipur in 1748 with the combined forces of the states of Kota, Bundi, Mewar and Marathas. Ishwari singh defeated the combined army at Battle of Rajamahal. The combined forces of Madho Singh got a battering at the hands of Ishwari Singh.  It was a major victory for Jaipur and to commemorate this occasion, Ishwari Singh built a second storied tower in 1749 which got the name Isar laat popularly known as Sarga Suli in the Tripolia Bazar. A person named Ganesh Khowal was entrusted with its construction.  All the 7 stories of Isat laat are octagonal and after every two storeys is a round gallery. Ishwari Singh lost at the Battle of Bagru, about 20–25 km from Jaipur. He was forced to give lands to Madho Singh and pay tribute to the Holkars.

Ishwari Singh, ruler of Jaipur, consumed poison, and his queen and concubines committed jauhar fearing loss of honour at the hands of Holkar. On 10 Jan 1751, 5,000 Marathas entered Jaipur. the pent-up hatred of the Rajputs burst forth and a riot broke out. The Rajputs massacred over 3000 of them  The memorial of this Maharaja, who ruled Jaipur for 7 turbulent years, is situated near the lake Tal Katora near the City Palace complex.  It has attractive wall paintings on it.

Battle of Manupur

Ishvari Singh joined the Mughals and the Sikhs in the Battle of Manupur on 21 March 1748, which resulted in the defeat and retreat of Ahmad Shah Abdali back to Kandahar.

References 

1721 births
1750 deaths